Alfred Gassner (born 2 January 1947) is an Austrian footballer. He played in three matches for the Austria national football team from 1971 to 1976.

References

External links
 

1947 births
Living people
Austrian footballers
Austria international footballers
Place of birth missing (living people)
Association footballers not categorized by position